Anaplectidae is a family of cockroaches in the order Blattodea. Previously placed as a subfamily of the Ectobiidae there are presently (2020) two genera and more than 90 described species in Anaplectidae.

Genera
These two genera belong to the family Anaplectidae:
 Anaplecta Burmeister, 1838
 Maraca Hebard, 1926

References

External links
 

Cockroaches
Cockroach families